In 2014 SA's Got Talent returned for another season. The season started on 7 September. Tatz remained the host. It has been announced that Shado is also staying, but Ian and Kabelo will leave. Lalla Hirayama and DJ Fresh are joined the judging panel this year.

Auditions

Open Auditions

Judges Auditions 
Acts who were accepted in the open auditions, make it through to the judges audition, where it is televised with a live audience.
For the judges auditions, there is 1 episode per city where hundreds of acts are put through to have a chance to get to the next round - the semi finals, although only 18 acts will get through.

Semi finals
There are 3 episodes in the semi finals part of this competition. Each episode consists of 6 acts. There are also 3 result episodes in which 2 acts from each episode are put through to the finals.

Semi finalist summary

Semi Final 1 

Result show guest: Johnny Apple

Semi Final 2 

Result show guest: Cassper Nyovest

Semi Final 3 

Result show guest: Harrison Crump

Finals 

6 acts are put through to the finals with 1 winner, ultimately, that wins the grand prize of R250 000.

Result show guest: AKA

Episode summary

References

Got Talent
2014 South African television seasons